Jerry Duane Ott (born 1947) is an American artist.

He is best known for his photorealism work and creative use of painting surfaces. His latest technical development are paintings wrapped across two- and three-dimensional surfaces. They range from drawings a few inches wide to sculptural assemblages more than five feet tall and eight feet long. His paintings are more about the nature of art and the experience of seeing than about the subjects they depict.

Jerry Ott is a true master airbrush artist and a leading painter in the photo realist school of painting that emerged in the 1960s. In the early 1970s JOtt received a great deal of attention in his career as one of two such artists – Hilo Chen being the other – dealing exclusively with the nude figure.

Ott's work has found international acclaim. His realistic paintings appear in the art capitals of Europe, Japan and as far a field as New Zealand. Among the prestigious institutions that have acquired his works are New York City's Metropolitan Museum of Art, the Smithsonian Institution, Washington, DC, the Minneapolis Institute of Arts and the Walker Art Center.

In his recent paintings, the effects of light and shade, optical illusions, nubile woman and delicate flesh continue to fascinate Ott. In "Pipe Dreams," he juxtaposes a pretty but unanimated girl with three banal lamps which refer to the mass-produced ceramic jars, vases and lamps sold as art. In Ott's painting, however, the reflections in the porcelain lamp bases and shadows that play across the skin are least as important as the woman herself.

References 
 e-fineart
 Paulcava
 Walker Art Center

American artists
1947 births
Living people